Sportklub Sturm Graz is an Austrian women's football club based in Graz, Styria. The club was founded in 1909 however the women's section has been in existence since 2011. Sturm Graz play in the ÖFB-Frauenliga, the top flight of domestic women's football in Austria and are regular competitors in the UEFA Women's Champions League. The team's colours are black and white.

Sturm Graz plays its home matches at the Messendorf Trainingszentrum, a 1,500-capacity stadium that is situated in Graz.

History 
The club was formed in 2011 after taking over FC Stattegg's women's team, despite interest from rivals Grazer AK in also taking over the team. The club started out playing in the 2nd Women's League East, before getting promoted at the end of the 2012/13 into the ÖFB-Frauenliga. After an 8th place finish in their inaugural top-flight season, Sturm Graz went from strength to strength and qualified for the UEFA Women's Champions League after finishing 2nd in the 2015/16 season. They were knocked out of their first Champions League campaign at the Round of 32, losing 0-9 on aggregate to Zürich. Since the 2015/16 season, Sturm Graz have finished as runners-up twice more.

Current squad

Honours
 ÖFB-Frauenliga
Runners-up (3): 2015-16, 2016–17, 2018–19

Record in UEFA Women's Champions League

Summary

By season

References

Women's football clubs in Austria
SK Sturm Graz